Maria Sanchez and Yasmin Schnack were the defending champions, having won the event in 2012, but Schnack chose not to defend her title. Sanchez paired up with Irina Falconi, but lost in the first round to Kateřina Kramperová and Ilona Kremen.

Nicola Slater and Coco Vandeweghe won the title, defeating Nicole Gibbs and Shelby Rogers in the final, 6–3, 7–6(7–4).

Seeds

Draw

References 
 Draw

Boyd Tinsley Women's Clay Court Classic - Doubles